Lebrunia bushaie is a flowering plant species of the family Calophyllaceae and the sole species comprised in the genus Lebrunia. The plant is native to Africa.

References

Calophyllaceae